Herbert Swan may refer to:
 Herbert Swan (Australian politician), member of the Legislative Assembly of Western Australia
 Herbert Swan (Canadian politician), Speaker of the Legislative Assembly of Saskatchewan

See also
 Herbert Swann, English footballer